Robert Earnest Rozier Jr. (born July 28, 1955) is an American murderer and former defensive end.

Born in Alaska but raised in California, Rozier was a high-school and collegiate athlete before briefly playing professional gridiron football.  In the 1980s, he joined the Nation of Yahweh, and by Halloween 1986 had killed at least four people on behalf of the religious group.  Charged therefor, Rozier turned state's evidence against the group and its leader, and was sentenced to 22 years in prison; he was paroled after ten and put into witness protection.  After Rozier was caught bouncing checks in 1999, he was sentenced to 25 years-to-life under California's three-strikes law in 2001.

Personal life
Born on July 28, 1955 in Anchorage, Alaska Territory, Robert Earnest Rozier Jr. was a United States Air Force brat who grew up in California.

At Cordova High School in Rancho Cordova, California, he scored a 1.32 grade point average and did not receive his high school diploma.  Rozier was later a student at both Grays Harbor College in Aberdeen, Washington and the University of California, Berkeley (majoring in African-American studies), but graduated from neither school.

By 1999, Rozier was living in Cameron Park, California, owned an auto detailing business in Sacramento, worked in web design, and had raised two children.

Athletics

School
At Cordova High, Rozier was an athletic wunderkind: the teen played American football as a defensive end and was "all-league, all-conference, all-Northern California."  The high-schooler could also high jump , vertical jump , sprint the 40-yard dash in 4.7 seconds, and bench press .  When he was passed over to play college football for lacking his Cordova High diploma, he enrolled at Grays Harbor College where he was eventually recruited by University of California, Berkeley's football coach, Mike White.  At California, team captain Ralph DeLoach described Rozier as "the best athlete on the team".

Professional
The  and  Bob Rozier was drafted by the St. Louis Cardinals in the ninth round of the 1979 NFL Draft (228th overall).  A defensive end, Rozier played as number 75 for six games in 1979, starting for none of them.  Rozier's professional sports career in the states was derailed by "allegations of drug use and petty crime."  Rozier briefly moved on to the Canadian Football League, playing for the Hamilton Tiger-Cats and the Saskatchewan Roughriders, and finally signed with the Oakland Raiders ("a team with a reputation for collecting misfits") for only two weeks.

Criminal activity
By November 1986, the Royal Canadian Mounted Police had 32 warrants for fraud against Rozier.

Nation of Yahweh
After meeting founder Yahweh ben Yahweh in 1982, by 1986, Rozier had become an ardent supplicant to the Nation of Yahweh, a religious movement that "teaches that American blacks are the true Jews."  He donated all of his possessions, and took the name Neariah Israel.

In an effort to join the Yahweh's "Brotherhood"—"a secret group […] of tall, muscular young men available for discrete missions"—Rozier undertook the initiation of killing random "white devils".  In April 1986, in the Miami neighborhood of Coconut Grove, Rozier followed a drunk white man to his apartment and killed him and his roommate with a  Japanese knife.  On September 5, Rozier and another Brotherhood member killed the unconscious 61-year-old Raymond Kelly, who was parked in a bar parking lot; the two men cut off the victim's ear to show ben Yahweh, and when they lost it, returned to the body to cut off the other.  Fifteen days later, Rozier and three other Yahwehs killed 45-year-old Cecil Branch (stabbing him 25 times) in retaliation for a previous confrontation.

Under the auspices of trying to improve the property, Yahweh members spent that week attempting to evict residents. On October 31, 28-year-old Anthony Brown and 37-year-old Rudolph Broussard were shot to death, and Rozier was charged with one count of first-degree murder.

Upon Rozier's arrest, he told police that "he was 404 years old and couldn't remember his life before conversion."  For seven months, the Nation supported Rozier with a lawyer (Ellis Rubin) and a public-relations campaign; when Rozier issued an ultimatum to the church for a different lawyer, he was excommunicated.  In March 1988, Rozier turned state's evidence in exchange for a 22-year sentence.  He told of the Nation of Yahweh's crimes to the Metro-Dade Police Department (MDPD): some murders were committed in retaliation, some members of the church would brag about killing on behalf of the group, and a church rumor told of its own involvement in the 1983 public beating death of martial artist Leonard Dupree.  Rozier also explained about the Brotherhood, its initiation, and its purpose.  All-told, Rozier personally confessed to four murders.

By 1990, the MDPD had built a "14-murder conspiracy indictment against 16 members of the Yahweh Nation and their spiritual leader, Yahweh Ben Yahweh."  This case relied heavily upon Rozier's claims, a vector of attack used by Yahwehs' criminal defense lawyers; Patricia Williams (defending Judith Israel a.k.a. Linda Gaines) claimed "Robert Rozier is singing a song in order to avoid a life sentence or death sentence", and Curtis Jones (defending Isaiah Solomon Israel a.k.a. James Littlejohn) alleged that "He's the biggest liar […] I dare say the man would lie on his mother, much less Yahweh Ben Yahweh, his friends and associates. ... He's been able to elude Old Sparky (Florida's electric chair) four times."  Despite these attacks on Rozier, the MDPD had never caught the man in a lie.  Ultimately, ben Yahweh was acquitted of murder after Rozier was discredited.

For his 22-year sentence, Rozier was imprisoned outside of Florida under a new name courtesy the United States Federal Witness Protection Program.  In 1996, after ten years behind bars, Rozier was paroled with the new identity of Robert Rameses.  In 1999, he expressed remorse for his crimes, telling the Associated Press that he had "rebuilt his life in an intense spiritual and intellectual transformation."

Third strike
Rozier volunteered his criminal past and former identity; though the new charge would otherwise be a misdemeanor, under California's then-new three-strikes law, state prosecutors sought felony charges. By May 2000, Rozier was imprisoned in South Lake Tahoe, California, waiting for a June trial. Under his witness-protection alias, Rozier was denied parole on February 16, 2022, and is not eligible for another hearing until 2027.

References

1955 births
20th-century African-American sportspeople
African-American players of American football
African-American players of Canadian football
American football defensive ends
American people convicted of murder
American prisoners sentenced to life imprisonment
American sportspeople convicted of crimes
Black Hebrew Israelite people
California Golden Bears football players
criminals from Alaska
Hamilton Tiger-Cats players
living people
people convicted of murder by Florida
people from Anchorage, Alaska
people who entered the United States Federal Witness Protection Program
players of American football from Anchorage, Alaska
prisoners sentenced to life imprisonment by California
racially motivated violence against European Americans
Saskatchewan Roughriders players
sportspeople convicted of murder
St. Louis Cardinals (football) players
University of California, Berkeley alumni